The women's 75 kilograms event at the 1998 Asian Games took place on 12 December 1998 at Thunder Dome, Maung Thong Thani Sports Complex.

Results

References
 Results

External links
 Weightlifting Database

Weightlifting at the 1998 Asian Games